Placer County Transit is the operator of mass transportation for western Placer County, California, excluding the city of Roseville, which has its own public transit system. In addition to six local routes, Placer County Transit also operates the Lincoln School Tripper in Lincoln, California, a bus supplement during school days, and the Placer Commuter Express, a commuter bus service between Downtown Sacramento and the Colfax Amtrak station. In addition to their fixed route service, Placer County Transit also operates Dial-a-ride services in local communities.

On July 1, 2015, Placer County Transit took over operations from Lincoln's fixed-route and Dial-a-ride bus network, Lincoln Transit.

Route list
All of Placer County Transit's routes operate Monday-Saturday, with the exceptions of Route 40, Placer Commuter Express (which run weekdays only) and Lincoln School Tripper (which runs on school days). There is no service on Sundays and holidays.

 Route 10 - Auburn to Light Rail
 Serves Auburn Station, Sierra College, Westfield Galleria at Roseville, Louis Orlando Transit Center and Watt/I-80 light rail station
 Route 20 - Lincoln/Rocklin/Sierra College
 Serves Thunder Valley Casino, Westfield Galleria at Roseville and Sierra College
 Route 30 - Highway 49
 Route 40 - Colfax/Alta
 Route 50 - Taylor Road Shuttle
 Serves the Dial-a-ride zone between Sierra College and Auburn Station
 Route 70 - Lincoln Circulator
 Lincoln School Tripper
 Placer Commuter Express
 Runs four times in the morning toward Downtown Sacramento and four times in the evening toward Roseville, Rocklin, Loomis, Penryn, Auburn, Clipper Gap and Colfax

See also
 Roseville Transit
 Sacramento Regional Transit District

References 

Bus transportation in California
Transportation in Sacramento, California
Transportation in Placer County, California